Rosental an der Kainach is a municipality in the district of Voitsberg in the Austrian state of Styria.

Economy
Rosental was once a brown coal mining town.

References

Cities and towns in Voitsberg District